The Fanelli Boys is an American sitcom television series that aired on NBC from September 8, 1990 to February 16, 1991, as part of its 1990–91 prime time schedule. The series was created by the team of Barry Fanaro, Mort Nathan, Kathy Speer, and Terry Grossman, all of whom previously worked on The Golden Girls.

Synopsis
Following the death of her husband, Theresa Fanelli (Ann Morgan Guilbert) is prepared to sell the family business (a funeral home) to her son Anthony (Ned Eisenberg) and move from Brooklyn to Florida. Thwarting her plans are the arrival of her younger sons Ronnie (Andy Hirsch), who had just dropped out of school, and Frankie (Chris Meloni), whose engagement has just been broken. Another brother, the slightly disreputable Dom (Joe Pantoliano), is between hustles. Anthony learns that the funeral home is about $25,000 in debt, which he had not counted on. Soon, all of the boys are back at home with their mom, just like the old days. Advising the family, somewhat dubiously, are Theresa's brother, a Catholic priest known as "Father Angelo" (Richard Libertini), and fortune teller Philomena (Vera Lockwood).

The Fanelli Boys showed fairly strong Italian-American ethnic stereotyping; there was even an Italian flag in the program's logo. The series garnered low ratings and was cancelled in February 1991 after airing nineteen episodes.

Cast
Joe Pantoliano.....Dom Fanelli 
Ann Morgan Guilbert.....Theresa Fanelli
Ned Eisenberg.....Anthony Fanelli 
Christopher Meloni.....Frankie Fanelli 
Andy Hirsch.....Ronnie Fanelli 
Richard Libertini.....Father Angelo
Vera Lockwood.....Philomena

Title sequence
The show's original opening sequence was filmed footage of a dining room table (presumably the Fanellis') as it was set by its family, followed by them sitting down and serving pasta and wine, which culminated in everyone toasting. Only the family's hands were seen during the entire sequence. This was accompanied by an instrumental, old-world Italian tune.

In January 1991, a month before The Fanelli Boys was cancelled, the opening changed to featuring videotaped scenes from the show with the cast, along with an in-house rendition of Billy Joel's "Why Should I Worry?" as the new lyrical theme.

Episodes

References

External links 
 
 

1990 American television series debuts
1991 American television series endings
1990s American sitcoms
English-language television shows
NBC original programming
Television series about families
Television series by ABC Studios
Television shows set in New York City